League of Legends is a multiplayer online battle arena video game developed and published by Riot Games. Announced in October 2008, it was released for Microsoft Windows in Europe and North America as a free-to-play title on October 27, 2009, after six months of beta testing. The game has since been ported to macOS and localized for markets worldwide; by 2012 it was the most played game in the world. League of Legends is often considered to be the biggest esport globally, with the 2020 League of Legends World Championship final peaking at  concurrent viewers.

To commemorate the tenth anniversary of the game, Riot debuted several pieces of spin-off games, including a version for mobiles and consoles, a digital collectible card game named Legends of Runeterra, and a standalone mobile release of the auto battler game mode Teamfight Tactics. Later the same year, Riot announced Riot Forge, a publishing label for video games set in the League of Legends universe developed by third-party developers. After previously releasing the tabletop game Mechs vs. Minions in 2016, Riot made public a tabletop division in early 2020 along with its first title, which was released in September that year.

In addition to these games, many other forms of League of Legends media have been produced, such as books, music videos and short stories. Several soundtrack albums have been released for digital download and streaming, as well as two LP records. Bands composed of characters from the game have also released music, including the girl group K/DA, whose songs have topped Billboards World Digital Song Sales chart. After releasing multiple one-shot comics on its website, Riot partnered with Marvel Comics in 2018 to create series of comics. The first – Ashe: Warmother – debuted that December, and was followed by Lux and Zed in 2019. Riot has also produced documentary films about the development and history of League of Legends, and is set to premiere the animated television series Arcane on Netflix in fall 2021.

Games 
All games are developed and published by Riot Games, except where noted.

Video games

Upcoming

Minigames

Tabletop games

Applications

Music

Soundtracks

Vinyl records

Remixes

Virtual bands 
Albums and EPs released by virtual bands composed of League of Legends champions.

Literature

Books

Comics

Series

One Shots 
One-shot comics published on the League of Legends Universe website.

Television and film

Notes

References

External links 
 League of Legends Universe
 
 

Media
League of Legends
League of Legends